Marc Narciso Dublan (born 20 January 1974) is a Spanish chess Grandmaster (GM) (2003).

Biography
In 1987 and 1988, Marc Narciso Dublan twice won silver medal in Spanish Youth Chess Championship in the U14 age group. He three times won Catalan Chess Championships: in 1992, in 1995, and in 2011.

Marc Narciso Dublan has participated in international chess tournaments many times and won or shared 1 st place in Ibi (1996), La Pobla de Lillet (1999), Budapest (First Saturday tournament, 2001), Mondariz (2002), Barberà del Vallès (2005), Montcada i Reixac (2006), Varbera del Valles (2006), Barcelona (2006), Manresa (2007), Illes Medes (2008), San Sebastián (2009), Konya (2009).

Marc Narciso Dublan played for Spain in the Chess Olympiad:
 In 2006, at second reserve board in the 37th Chess Olympiad in Turin (+3, =4, -1).

Marc Narciso Dublan played for Spain in the European Team Chess Championships:
 In 2001, at reserve board in the 13th European Team Chess Championship in León (+0, =2, -3),
 In 2007, at reserve board in the 16th European Team Chess Championship in Heraklion (+0, =2, -3).

In 1997, he was awarded the FIDE International Master (IM) title and received the FIDE Grandmaster (GM) title six years later.

References

External links

Marc Narciso Dublan chess games at 365chess.com

1974 births
Living people
Sportspeople from Barcelona
Spanish chess players
Chess grandmasters
Chess Olympiad competitors